Mount Redoubt is the name of three mountains:

 Mount Redoubt (Alaska) an active volcano in Alaska, United States
 Mount Redoubt (Washington) in Washington, United States
 Redoubt Mountain in Banff National Park, Canada

See also
 Redoubt (disambiguation)